Polska Nowa Wieś  is a village in the administrative district of Gmina Komprachcice, within Opole County, Opole Voivodeship, in south-western Poland.

Even today there is still a minority of Germans living in Neudorf. Since 2009 the city has the German name "Polnisch Neudorf", which was used before the year 1914. Notable is that the name "Neudorf in Oberschlesien" was not used, even if the name change was before 1933–45. 

The village has a population of 1,858.

References

Villages in Opole County